Radiospongilla is a genus of freshwater sponges in the family Spongillidae. It was defined by Penney and Racek in 1968. The type species is Radiospongilla sceptroides.

Species
The following species are recognised in the family:
 Radiospongilla amazonensis Volkmer & Maciel, 1983
 Radiospongilla cantonensis (Gee, 1929)
 Radiospongilla cerebellata (Bowerbank, 1863)
 Radiospongilla cinerea (Carter, 1849)
 Radiospongilla crateriformis (Potts, 1882)
 Radiospongilla hemephydatia (Annandale, 1909)
 Radiospongilla hispidula (Racek, 1969)
 Radiospongilla hozawai (Sasaki, 1936)
 Radiospongilla indica (Annandale, 1907)
 Radiospongilla inesi Nicacio & Pinheiro, 2011
 Radiospongilla multispinifera (Gee, 1933)
 Radiospongilla philippinensis (Annandale, 1909)
 Radiospongilla sansibarica (Weltner, 1895)
 Radiospongilla sceptroides (Haswell, 1883)
 Radiospongilla sendai (Sasaki, 1936)
 Radiospongilla sinoica (Racek, 1969)
 Radiospongilla streptasteriformis Stanisic, 1978

References

Spongillidae